Tôi là... người chiến thắng is a Vietnamese vocal game show, airing on HTV7 at 9:00 pm (UTC+7) prime time slot every Saturdays. The show premiered on May 25, 2013 with Bình Minh as the host and Siu Black/Hoài Linh as a special 101st judge. The winner of the show might take home 300,000,000 VND in cash (roughly $14,000). The first season includes 12 episodes, featuring contestants in eight categories namely Boys, Girls, Male Singers, Female Singers, Students, Middle Ages, Celebrities and Groups.

The show builds its format differently from the original and the U.S. adaptation that in the first rounds there are no battles. In fact, all the candidates are singing for the public vote. The four candidates with highest scores of a category are then advanced to second round, singing duet for survival.

Trần Hải Châu, a 21-year-old student, won the first season and obtained the final grand prizes, including a studio single with Universal Music, and 630,000,000 ₫ in cash (almost $30,000).

The show will return in 2014 with 12 episodes. Eight categories are introduced, including two Celebrity categories, two Singer categories, Students, Middle Ages, together with newly two Underground Singer categories. Comedians and Bands/Groups are originally official categories of the 2014 season; they, however, were dropped out due to lack of qualified candidates.

Synopsis 
Đông Tây Promotion and Ho Chi Minh City Television won the right to produce the Vietnamese adaptation. It might be the first Asian adaptation of the franchise and it was launched before the U.S. adaptation. The first season was hosted by Bình Mình and starred Siu Black or Hoài Linh, who can affect the result of a duet. Each episode is about a category, a quarter final round, a semifinal round and a finale while the original focuses on the first phase (first-rounded battles in many categories), the second phase (second and third-rounded battles in many categories), the quarter final/semifinal/season finale.

The Vietnamese adaptation marks its uniqueness as a mix of two hot shows Deal or No Deal and The Voice.

Format 
The program consists of several phases. In the first phase, the pre-selection, all entries are reviewed by the production jury. All candidates are invited to audition and based on that audition is decided whether the candidate is good enough to be allowed for television recordings. After short-listing the candidates are divided into eight categories of eight candidates. In all these first rounds eight candidates sing solo and the panel of 101 judges, including Siu Black (later replaced by Hoài Linh from the live show,) thus score them. The four highest scores are moved to the second rounds in two battles. In the case that the highest four cannot be determined, if two candidates have the same score (making the highest five) then Siu Black has the ultimate power to decide who had better leave the competition for good; if three or more candidates have the same score (making the highest six or more) the ultimate power is shifted to the audience to vote off some. And the highest score of them all has the right to pick the opponent for a battle. Thereafter the second rounds happen and "deal" element is introduced. Accepted the deal and earned the money of 10,000,000 VND, the candidate is automatically evicted from the competition no matter how many score he gains in the battle and the opponent is immediately declared winning. Otherwise no deal occurs, the candidate with higher score wins and the money is added up to the final grand prize. The eight categories are covered in first eight episodes.

The two winners of a category advance to the quarter final round, where it can be. Again earned money of 20,000,000 VND the loser is right out of the league. Otherwise no deal occurs, the candidate with higher score wins and the money is added up to the final grand prize. The quarter final rounds are covered in two episodes.

In the very last battle to decide who the winner is, the audience voting is used as a determining factor. Audience can score from home in the last 15 minutes, which gives 100 to the battle, adding with score from 101 judges to make a possible 201 score.

Step by step the candidate is out until there is only one remain, taking the final grand prize home. The final grand prize includes the basic prize announced of 300,000,000 ₫ in cash, and the negotiation prizes during battles if no deal occurred.

Season 1
 Legend
 – Contestant wins and/or advances
 - Contestant wins the grand prize
 – Contestant loses and/or is eliminated
 – Contestant takes the money offer and is eliminated
GUY - Candidate from Guy Category
GRL - Candidate from Girl Category
STU - Candidate from Student Category
MA - Candidate from Middle Age Category
CEL - Candidate from Celebrity Category
GRP - Candidate from Band/Group Category
MSG - Candidate from Male Singer Category
FSG - Candidate from Female Singer Category

Results

Episodes

Episode 1: Girls 
Aired: May 25, 2013

Episode 2: Male Singers 
Aired: June 01, 2013

Episode 3: Groups 
Aired: June 08, 2013

Episode 4: Middle Ages 
Aired: June 15, 2013

Episode 5: Students 
Aired: June 22, 2013

Episode 6: Boys 
Aired: June 29, 2013

Episode 7: Female Singers 
Aired: July 06, 2013

Episode 8: Celebrities 
Aired: July 13, 2013

 After the first round, Tú Vi, Minh Luân and Hùng Thuận have the same score. Audience are asked to vote for each the second time. As a result, Minh Luân leaves the competition with 47.

Episode 9: The Quarter Final, Part 1 
Live: July 20, 2013

Episode 10: The Quarter Final, Part 2 
Live: July 27, 2013

Episode 11: The Semi Final 
Live: August 03, 2013

Episode 12: Season Finale 
Live: August 10, 2013

 The final scores are added up by score from 101 judges with score from fan vote. Huy Luân gets 27 out of possible 100 by audience voting, the rest belongs to Hải Châu.

 Guest appearance:
 Hồ Ngọc Hà ("Hãy thứ tha cho em")
 Văn Mai Hương ("Là em đó")

Season 2 
By the high-rated demography, the TV series was renewed for another season during the grand finale of the first season. It is set to return on July 12, 2014. Application for season two began on November 14 and ends on April 30. 12 episodes are ordered to air, with differences from season 1. Contestants after being selected will be divided into eight categories, namely: Celebrity #1, Celebrity #2, Singer #1, Singer #2, Underground Singer #1, Underground Singer #2, Student, and Middle Age. Band/Group was originally an official category of this season; it, however, has been dropped out due to lack of qualified candidates.

 Legend
 – Contestant wins and/or advances
 - Contestant wins the grand prize
 – Contestant loses and/or is eliminated
 – Contestant takes the money offer and is eliminated
CE1 - Candidate from first CEebrity Category
CE2 - Candidate from second CEebrity Category
SG1 - Candidate from first Singer Category
SG2 - Candidate from second Singer Category
US1 - Candidate from first Underground Singer Category
US2 - Candidate from second Underground Singer Category
MA - Candidate from Middle Age Category
STU - Candidate from Student Category

Results

Syndication 
 Season 1

 Season 2

Cancellation 
On September 29, 2015, HTV and Đông Tây Promotion announced that they did not renew the 4th season due to expenses. In the next year, Biến hóa hoàn hảo - My name is filled the show's 9 p.m. time slot, confirmed its cancellation.

See also 
 The Winner is... (the Dutch original)
 The Winner Is (adaptation for the U.S.)
List of television programmes broadcast by HTV

References

External links 

Vietnamese television series
Ho Chi Minh City Television original programming
2010s Vietnamese television series
2013 Vietnamese television series debuts